Basil is a plant and seasoning.

Basil may also refer to:
 Basil (name), people named Basil
 Basil, California, former name of Redwood Valley, California
 Basil (novel), by Wilkie Collins
 Basil (film), a 1998 film by Radha Bharadwaj starring Jared Leto
 Basil (Sesame Park), the main character on the Canadian children's show Sesame Park
 Basil Fawlty, the main character in Fawlty Towers
 Saint Basil (disambiguation)
The Great Mouse Detective, also known as Basil the Great Mouse Detective, an animated film by Disney
 Basil, a character from the video game Omori
 A type of leather tanned with redoul

See also 

 Basel, Switzerland
 
 Basal (disambiguation), referring to a base or minimum level
 Basilica (disambiguation)
 Bazel (disambiguation)
 Vasily (disambiguation), the Slavic form of the name